Yevgeny Brailovsky (born 2 January 1984) is a Russian freestyle skier. He competed in the men's aerials event at the 2006 Winter Olympics.

References

1984 births
Living people
Russian male freestyle skiers
Olympic freestyle skiers of Russia
Freestyle skiers at the 2006 Winter Olympics
Sportspeople from Tashkent